Kent East was an electoral riding in Ontario, Canada. It was created in 1875 when the riding of Bothwell was split into the ridings of Kent East and Kent West. It was abolished in 1966 before the 1967 election when the ridings of Kent East and Kent West were merged to form the riding of Kent.

Members of Provincial Parliament

References

Former provincial electoral districts of Ontario